The Mall at Wellington Green is a two level super-regional shopping mall in Wellington, Florida. The mall features Dillard's, JCPenney, Macy's, City Furniture, Ashley Furniture, CMX Theaters and over 170 stores and eateries. As one of the last malls built in both Palm Beach County and all of South Florida, it opened in 2001 by Taubman Centers, and was sold to Starwood Retail Partners in 2014.

History
Upon opening on October 8, 2001, the mall's anchors were Burdines, Dillard's (which opened its first South Florida store at The Galleria at Fort Lauderdale in 1993 and Pembroke Lakes in 1995), JCPenney, and Lord & Taylor, whose store relocated from Palm Beach Mall. Wellington Green, alongside Pembroke Lakes Mall, are among the few malls in South Florida that opened without a Jordan Marsh store because their Florida division went defunct before the openings of both malls. Burdines was dual branded as Burdines-Macy's in 2003, and simply Macy's in 2005. Lord & Taylor closed in 2004, and in 2007, that building was split into three tenants: City Furniture on the lower level, and Ashley Furniture and La-Z-Boy on the upper level. La-Z-Boy™ closed in 2014 to make room for Paragon Theaters, which opened on February 10, 2017, and was purchased by CMX Cinemas on September 19 of the same year. Nordstrom opened in the Fall of 2003, two years after the mall's grand opening, and closed on April 5, 2019, following an announcement on January 23.

Several properties including the Shoppes of Wellington Green, a lifestyle center, and Wellington Green Commons, a Whole Foods Market-anchored power center encircle the shopping mall.

Current Tenants
Dillard's (original tenant) (since 2001)
JCPenney (original tenant) (since 2001)
Macy's (since 2005)
Ashley Furniture (since 2007)
City Furniture (since 2007)
CMX Cinemas (since 2017)

Former Tenants
Lord & Taylor (original tenant) (2001-2004) (Replaced by La-Z-Boy, City Furniture, and Ashley Furniture Home Store)
Burdines (original tenant) (2001-2003) (Replaced by Burdines-Macy's) 
La-Z-Boy (2007-2014) (Replaced by Paragon Theaters)
Burdines-Macy's (2003-2005) (Replaced by Macy's)
Paragon Theaters (2017) (Replaced by CMX Cinemas)
Nordstrom (2003-2019)

References

External links
The Mall at Wellington Green official website

Shopping malls in Palm Beach County, Florida
Shopping malls established in 2001
Wellington, Florida
2001 establishments in Florida